The Lord Tredegar is a pub at 50 Lichfield Road, Bow, London E3.

It is a Grade II listed building, built in the mid-19th century.

It is part of the Remarkable Restaurants chain of 13 pubs in London.

References

External links
 
 

Grade II listed pubs in London
Pubs in the London Borough of Tower Hamlets
Grade II listed buildings in the London Borough of Tower Hamlets